Conviction is a made-for-television biopic about Carl Upchurch, a hardcore felon who managed to educate himself and developed a spiritual awakening during one of his numerous stints inside prison. He began to spread his message to other inmates, and soon he was asked to help mediate problems between some of the most feared street gangs in the country. Directed by Kevin Rodney Sullivan, Conviction stars Omar Epps as Upchurch and features supporting turns from Dana Delany and Charles S. Dutton. The film first aired in 2002.

References

External links
 

2002 television films
2002 films
Films directed by Kevin Rodney Sullivan